Local elections was held in the Province of Pampanga on May 9, 2016, as part of the 2016 general election.  Voters selected candidates for all local positions: a town mayor, vice mayor and town councilors, as well as members of the Sangguniang Panlalawigan, the vice-governor, governor and representatives for the four districts of Pampanga.

Gubernatorial election
Incumbent Governor Lilia Pineda ran for her final term unopposed.

Vice gubernatorial election
Incumbent Vice Governor Dennis Pineda ran for reelection unopposed.

Congressional election

1st District
Yeng Guiao was the incumbent. He faced Jon Lazatin, son of former Representative Carmelo "Tarzan" Lazatin Sr. and the one emerging from the  grass roots; a former Clark Development Corporation's multi-awarded employee Edwin "Win" Bacay who uniquely focus his platforms on urban poor and poverty solutions.

2nd District
Incumbent Gloria Macapagal Arroyo ran for her last term unopposed.

3rd District
Oscar Rodriguez was the incumbent. He faced-off against former congressman Aurelio Gonzales Jr.

4th District
Juan Pablo Bondoc was the incumbent.

Sangguniang Panlalawigan Election

1st District
City: Angeles City, Mabalacat City
Municipalities: Magalang

2nd District
Municipalities: Floridablanca, Guagua, Lubao, Porac, Santa Rita, Sasmuan

3rd District
City: San Fernando City
Municipalities: Arayat, Bacolor, Mexico, Santa Ana

|-

4th District
Municipalities: Apalit, Candaba, Macabebe, Masantol, Minalin, San Luis, San Simon, Santo Tomas

City and Municipal Election

1st District
City: Angeles City, Mabalacat City
Municipalities: Magalang

Angeles
Edgardo Pamintuan Sr. was the incumbent, and was running for his final term. He was pitted against former Senator and former Pampanga Governor Lito Lapid and incumbent Vice Mayor Maria Vicenta Vega-Cabigting (who was on her final term, thus unable to seek re-election for that post).

Mabalacat City

Magalang

2nd District
Municipalities: Floridablanca, Guagua, Lubao, Porac, Santa Rita, Sasmuan

Floridablanca

Guagua

Lubao

Porac

Santa Rita

Sasmuan

3rd District
City: San Fernando City
Municipalities: Arayat, Bacolor, Mexico, Santa Ana

San Fernando City

Arayat

Bacolor

Mexico

Santa Ana

4th District
Municipalities: Apalit, Candaba, Macabebe, Masantol, Minalin, San Luis, San Simon, Santo Tomas

Apalit

Candaba

Macabebe

Masantol

Minalin

San Luis

San Simon

Santo Tomas

References

2016 Philippine local elections
2016
May 2016 events in the Philippines